This was a new event in 2012. Elina Svitolina won the first title, defeating Kimiko Date-Krumm 6–2, 6–3 in the final.

Seeds

Main draw

Finals

Top half

Bottom half

References

 Main Draw
 Qualifying Draw

Royal Indian Open - Singles
2012 in Indian tennis
Royal Indian Open